RTL Passion (stylized as RTL PASSION) is a German pay television  channel launched on 27 November 2006 and owned by RTL Group and Grundy UFA TV Produktions GmbH. Its programming is focused towards female audiences with soap operas, telenovelas and television dramas.

The channel gained a new logo and graphics package on 11 November 2015. The new logo is square-less, but it is different to the Croatian version.

The logo was changed again, on 15 September 2021, along with other sister channels, RTL Living and the main parent channel RTL.

Programming

Current programming 

A.D. The Bible Continues (A.D.: Rebellen und Märtyrer) (2016-2017)
Alles was zählt (All That Counts) (2008–present)
Arctic Air (2015)
Atlantis (2014–present)
Arvingerne (Die Erbschaft) (2017–present)
Azul (Azul - Paradies in Gefahr) (2007-2010)
Christine. Perfekt war gestern! (Christine. Perfect Was Yesterday!) (2017–present)
Club der roten Bänder (Club Of The Red Belts) (2016–present)
D'Artagnan et les Trois Mousquetaires (2005) (Die drei Musketiere) (2011–2012)
Dawson's Creek (2016–present)
Der Lehrer (The Teacher) (2017–present)
Doc meets Dorf (Doc Meets Village)(2017–present)
Downton Abbey (2018–present)
Dynasty (Der Denver-Clan) (2012-2014)
Falcon Crest (2008-2009, 2013-2014)
Glee (2012–present)
Gute Zeiten, schlechte Zeiten (Good Times, Bad Times) (2006–present)
Heartless (2018–present)
Hotel (2011-2013)
Jamaica Inn (Riff-Piraten) (2015–present)
Matchball (2008)
Mercy (2013-2015)
Mistresses (2016–present)
Party of Five (2016–present)
Providence (2016–present)
Once Upon a Time (Once Upon a Time - Es war einmal...) (2012–present)
Outlander (Outlander - Die Highland-Saga) (2015–present)
Rosa salvaje (Die wilde Rose) (2008, 2010-2011)
Royal Pains (2014-2017)
Salomé (2008-2011)
Secret Diary of a Call Girl (Secret Diary of a Call Girl - Geständnisse einer Edelhure) (2009-2013)
Sekretärinnen - Überleben von 9 bis 5 (Secretaries - Survive From 9 To 5) (2017–present)
Small Island (2014–present)
Sous le soleil (St. Tropez) (2006-2009)
Tess of the D'Urbervilles (Tess) (2011-2013)
The Collection (2017–present)
The Hollow Crown (2017–present)
The Paradise (2013–present)
The Smoke (2014-2017)
The Starter Wife (The Starter Wife - Alles auf Anfang) (2014–present)
Thirtysomething (Die besten Jahre) (2016–present)
Titans (Titans - Dynastie der Intrigen) (2008-2011)
Unter uns (2006–present)
Verbotene Liebe (Forbidden Love) (2006–present)
Vicious (2014-2017)
War & Peace (Krieg und Frieden) (2017–present)
Westerdeich (2008-2009)
Wildfire (2010-2012)
Your Family or Mine (2018–present)

Logo

Audience share

Germany

References

External links
 

Television stations in Germany
Television stations in Austria
Television stations in Switzerland
German-language television stations
Television channels and stations established in 2006
Women's interest channels